Kuala Nerus is a district in Terengganu, Malaysia. It is the youngest district in the state, having been declared a separate district in 2014. Formerly it was part of Kuala Terengganu district (North Kuala Terengganu) but still governed by Kuala Terengganu City Council (MBKT) which is one of few city councils in Malaysia to govern two separate districts. Its capital is Kuala Nerus town, other major towns and villages include Gong Badak, Seberang Takir, Batu Rakit and Batu Enam, all which are located within city limits of Kuala Terengganu. Kuala Nerus' population is 226,177 people as of 2015 which makes it the most populous district in Terengganu. The district has a total land area of 397.52 km2.

History
This district, formerly a part of Kuala Terengganu District, was declared on 18 September 2014.

Geography

The Redang archipelago is a group of islands in which two, the main island of Redang and Pinang Island, are inhabited, and the other smaller islands are not (Ling Island, Ekor Tebu Island, Lima Island, Paku Island, Paku Kecil Island, Kerengga Island, and Kerengga Kecil Island). The Redang Islands are located 45 kilometres away from Kuala Terengganu in the South China Sea. Together these islands contain around 500 species of corals and the thousands of fish and invertebrates. The islands are designated as a marine park in 1994. In Malaysia, a marine park is established to protect and manage the marine ecosystem and give people the opportunities to enjoy the underwater heritage. The Redang Islands are composed mainly of granite and sedimentary rocks that are metamorphosed. The main river is Redang River. Besides, Lang Tengah Island, Bidong Island, Geluk Island and Karah Island also under the jurisdiction of the district.

Administrative divisions

Kuala Nerus district is divided into four mukims, which are:
 Batu Rakit
 Kuala Nerus Town
 Pakoh (Belara)
 Redang Island

Federal Parliament and State Assembly Seats 

List of Kuala Nerus district representatives in the Federal Parliament (Dewan Rakyat)

List of Kuala Nerus district representatives in the State Legislative Assembly of Terengganu

Education
Significant development in the areas of higher education and housing projects have occurred there in contemporary times. Institutions of higher education include Universiti Malaysia Terengganu, the Institute of Teacher Education Dato Razali Ismail Campus and an industrial training institute. The Universiti Sultan Zainal Abidin (UniSZA) Teaching Hospital is also located in Kuala Nerus, along with its main campus.

Sports
 Sultan Mizan Zainal Abidin Stadium

Tourist attractions
Kuala Nerus has been described as a "popular tourist destination" by  former Prime Minister Datuk Seri Najib Tun Razak.

Places of interest such as:
 Redang Island
 Dapo Pata (Beach Kitchen) at Tok Jembal Beach
 Ikan Celup Tepung (ICT) at Teluk Ketapang Beach, Mengabang Telipot Beach
 Famous Keropok Lekor along the way from Seberang Takir to Sultan Mahmud Airport
 Batu 6 Wet Market
 Pulau Duyong- famous traditional boat making place and marina Pulau Duyong
 Air Buah Gelas Besar Seberang Takir
 Gong Badak Sports Complex which includes Sultan Mizan Zainal Abidin Stadium - Home of Terengganu FA Football Team
 Pantai Tok Jembal

Transportation
 Sultan Mahmud Airport

See also

 Districts of Malaysia

References